Matt Cornett is an American actor. He stars as E.J. Caswell on the Disney+ series High School Musical: The Musical: The Series, and is one of the protagonists of the Disney Channel film Zombies 3.

Early life
Cornett was raised in Rogers, Arkansas, before moving to Los Angeles in 2012 to pursue acting.

Filmography

Film

Television

References

External links
 

Year of birth missing (living people)
Living people
American male television actors
Male actors from Arkansas